Run, River is the debut novel of Joan Didion, first published in 1963.

Summary
The novel is both a portrait of a marriage and a commentary on the history of California. Everett McClellan and his wife, Lily Knight McClellan, are the great-grandchildren of pioneers, and what happens to them (murder and betrayal) is suggested as an epilogue to the pioneer experience.

Didion on Run, River
In her 2003 book of essays Where I Was From, Didion turned a critical eye on this novel, calling the novel's nostalgia ''pernicious''. She recalled writing it as a homesick girl lately moved from California to New York, and judged it to be a work of false nostalgia, the construction of an idyllic myth of rural Californian life that she knew never to have existed.

Original title
In a 1978 interview, Didion said that she had intended the title to be Run River but that the English publisher, Jonathan Cape, inserted a comma; "but it wasn't of very much interest to me because I hated it both ways.  The working title was In the Night Season", which her American publisher did not like.

References

External links
 Book page on the official website
 The Paris Review Interview with Joan Didion, 1978

1963 American novels
Novels by Joan Didion
Novels set in California
1963 debut novels